Novobadrakovo (Yañı Baźraq) is a rural locality (a village) in Uchpilinsky Selsoviet, Dyurtyulinsky District, Bashkortostan, Russia. The population was 26 as of 2010. There is 1 street.

Geography 
Novobadrakovo is located 30 km northeast of Dyurtyuli (the district's administrative centre) by road. Taubash-Badrakovo is the nearest rural locality.

References 

Rural localities in Dyurtyulinsky District